The 2021–22 Kansas City Roos men's basketball team represented the University of Missouri–Kansas City in the 2021–22 NCAA Division I men's basketball season. The Roos, led by third-year head coach Billy Donlon, played their home games at the Swinney Recreation Center in Kansas City, Missouri, as members of the Summit League.

Previous season
In a season limited due to the ongoing COVID-19 pandemic, the Roos finished the 2020–21 season 11–13, 7–7 in Summit League play to finish in a tie for fifth place. As the No. 6 seed in the Summit League tournament, they lost to North Dakota State in the quarterfinals.

Roster

Schedule and results

|-
!colspan=12 style=| Regular season

|-
!colspan=9 style=|

Source

References

Kansas City Roos men's basketball seasons
Kansas City Roos
Kansas City Roos men's basketball
Kansas City Roos men's basketball